is a 1993 real-time tactical role-playing game developed by Quest Corporation. Originally published for Super Nintendo Entertainment System by Quest in Japan and by Enix America in North America. It is the first installment of the Ogre Battle series. It was directed by Yasumi Matsuno, and designed by Matsuno with Akihiko Yoshida. The story of Ogre Battle focuses on a band of rebels as they lead a revolution against a corrupt reigning Empire, ruled by an evil Empress.

Ogre Battle was ported to the Sega Saturn and PlayStation, with enhancements made to the original gameplay. It was later released for Virtual Console, and mobile phones. A successor, titled Tactics Ogre, was released in Japan in 1995 for the Super Nintendo Entertainment System.

Gameplay

Ogre Battle: The March of the Black Queen begins in the outskirts of the Zeteginan Empire, twenty-four years after the founding of the empire through conquest. The main character is leading a revolution against this empire, which has turned to evil through the use of black magic by the mage Rashidi.

The game begins with the seer Warren using tarot cards to ask a series of questions to determine the player's suitability as leader of the revolution. There are several questions out of a fixed set which are randomly asked, each of which is associated with one of the twenty-two Major Arcana cards of divinatory tarot. Each question has three possible answers: one righteous, one evil, and one neutral. After the player finishes answering the questions, Warren wishes luck for the revolution and the game begins. The player's answers to these questions determine the Lord's (main character) abilities and starting units.

Ogre Battle mixes movement elements of a real-time tactics game with the character development and combat of a role-playing game. The game consists of a series of battles in which the player deploys units to fight against enemies and liberate occupied towns and temples. A variety of character types can be recruited, ranging from common to rare, many of whom can change class with experience points. As a result, the character will either evolve or become an entirely new soldier with different abilities.

Potential recruits consist of several historical and mythological figures, including knights, ninjas, wizards, angels, griffins, witches, and others. The player is free to organize multiple units of five fighters or fewer, with the limit being lower when larger characters are present. Additionally, time passes on the tactical map, alternating between day and night. In accordance with this element, vampires and werewolves will only be seen in the evening, with the former appearing in coffins during the day, and the latter appearing as normal men.

Each stage has a boss whose defeat signals the completion of the mission. Both during and after the stage, towns and temples can be visited to gain information or items. The game also features an alignment system, both for the revolution as a whole (reputation) and for individual characters (alignment and charisma). These parameters are influenced by how the game is played.

There are twenty-five main stages in the game, with some variation possible in how the stages are played. There are also four hidden stages accessible through the main game with an additional stage as an easter egg. The game can be completed without finishing all the stages. There are thirteen different endings to the main game, depending on the conduct of the player during the course of the game.

Modes of play
Ogre Battle has two main modes of play, the world map and the tactical map. On the world map, the player can manage their characters, changing their class, re-ordering them into different units, and erasing them. The player can also save and load the game, as well as manage items. In addition, the world map is where the player chooses the next stage, which can either be an already completed stage or a new stage.

Tactical map
When the player has selected a stage, action shifts to the tactical map. Here, the player can deploy units and move them around. Each unit has a cost associated with it, which must be paid to deploy the unit and every day at noon thereafter. There is a limit on the number of units that can be deployed at one time. Characters with high alignment fight better during the day, while those with low alignment fight better at night. There are also towns and temples that can be liberated by units. Upon liberation, a random tarot card is drawn, which can affect either the liberating unit's statistics, the statistics of all units on the battlefield or the reputation parameter. In addition, liberated towns provide income every noon, which can be used to buy items (some towns have shops that can be used when a unit is stationed there) or pay for unit costs. In addition, there are often hidden towns, temples, or items that can be found by moving a unit close to the appropriate location.

Battle
Each stage has a number of enemy units that attempt to re-capture the player's towns and temples. If a player's unit gets too close to an enemy unit, a battle ensues. During a battle, the view shifts to a close-up view of the two combatant units. Characters alternate taking actions with the battle ending after one round of combat (many units can attack multiple times per round). The unit that caused the most damage is the victor and forces the other unit to retreat.

During a battle, a player does not directly control their unit, but selects a tactic for the unit to follow (Best, Strong, Weak, Leader), which the characters follow when choosing whom to attack. The player can also use stored tarot cards, which can cause damage or have a special effect. The Lovers card will cause all affected enemies to fight for the player; the Moon card will change the formation of the enemy unit, causing them to attack differently; the Fool card will remove all enemies but the leader from battle. The player also has the option of retreating from any encounter.

Alignment
The game uses a moral alignment system that not only affects the gameplay but also where tactical and strategic decisions affect the outcome of a non-linear branching storyline, which is affected by several factors, such as the moral alignments of the troops used to liberate a city, whether to keep certain liberated cities guarded, making popular or unpopular decisions, concentrating power among just a few units, making deals with thieves, and a general sense of justice. These factors lead to one of 13 possible endings, alongside other factors, such as how many and which units are used, how battles are fought, the army's reputation, player character's alignment and charisma, and secrets discovered.

In Ogre Battle, alignment indicates how good or evil a character is. The scale runs from 0 to 100; the higher the number, the more 'good' the character is. When characters with high alignment liberate towns, it will raise the player's reputation (although a high charisma is also recommended). Characters with high alignment will be weak against dark attacks but strong against white attacks. They will fight better in the day and worse at night. Alignment can be raised by defeating enemies whose level is higher than the player's, defeating ghosts and other dark creatures, and drawing tarot cards that raise the alignment statistic. When the player's alignment is high, it is (somewhat counter-intuitively) recommended not to exceed the level of his or her foes. Alignment will drop when the player defeats high alignment characters, such as clerics and angels, or characters of a lower level. Thus, it is important for players who want to keep a high alignment to keep the fights "fair".

Low alignment characters are considered more "evil". Consequently, they fight better at night and are weak against light attacks. Liberating towns with these types of characters will lower the player's reputation (especially if they possess a low charisma statistic). A player whose alignment is relatively high will not necessarily be penalized for employing units of low-alignment soldiers; rather, a mix of high- and low-alignment fighters results in the most potent fighting force. Provided the player keeps low- and high-alignment characters in their own separate units, and only liberates towns with high-alignment units, he or she can still see the best ending. Conversely, one who wishes to drop his alignment can continually capture towns with a few high-level, low-alignment units. For example, one can employ a few decidedly low-alignment units to slaughter enemy units, reserving high-alignment units for liberation purposes only.

Classes
One of the most important aspects of Ogre Battle is the class system. Each character has a class that determines the characteristics of that character. There are several different classes available in Ogre Battle, but any given character is limited to a subset of class changes depending on their race. For instance, human characters can either be male (fighter) or female (amazon). There are also dragons, wyrms, pumpkins, angels, giants, hellhounds, octopuses, hawk men, demons, griffins, mermaids, golems and undead class trees. Within a tree, there are usually level, alignment, and often charisma requirements. In addition, some classes also require the use of a special item.  Finally, the two human class trees are unique in that they have the most branches in their tree and characters can be demoted to move along a different path.

Apart from statistic increases at level-up, a character's class also determines how the character moves and fights. Each character has a terrain type where they move fastest and fight the best (some classes also get additional attacks), with flying characters able to move quickly over all terrain. In addition, each class has a set of attacks characters can perform, ranging from physical attacks targeting one opponent to magical attacks targeting a whole unit.

Plot
Twenty-five years prior to the beginning of the game, Empress Endora conquered the continent of Zetegenia. During her reign, a resistance organization called the Liberation Army forms to free the continent from her rule.

At the beginning of the game, the protagonist, whose name, gender, and other characteristics are chosen by the player, takes command of the Liberation Army. Throughout the course of the game, the protagonist is joined by various other characters, such as Lans Hamilton, a knight who served the king of Zenobia until the king's death; Warren Omon, a wizard with the ability to divine the future; Tristan, the rightful prince of Zenobia; and many others.

After the Empress is slain, it is discovered that she was manipulated by Rashidi, a dark wizard in the Empress’ employ. The protagonist defeats him, but before Rashidi dies, he uses his blood to release Demundza, the king of the Underworld who was sealed away after the first great Ogre Battle. The protagonist and their army manage to seal Demundza away again before he can become too powerful. There are multiple outcomes to the story depending on various factors such as the protagonist's alignment, their reputation, and which characters they choose to recruit.

Development
Ogre Battle was created by Yasumi Matsuno, who joined developer Quest Corporation in 1989; the company at the time had two development teams, one working on an action game at the time, and Matsuno ended up leading design for the second team. He began development on Ogre Battle in the summer of 1991. Wanting to make his mark in the company, he pitched a real-time tactical game, as these were uncommon in the Japanese gaming market at the time. Matsuno acted as the game's director and designer. The producer was Quest CEO Makoto Tokugawa. The less conventional gameplay approach was also meant to compete against Dragon Quest and Final Fantasy, which dominated the RPG market. Matsuno had never played a tactical game before this, but on staff recommendations played Nobunaga's Ambition to get a feel for the genre. Matsuno grew frustrated with the corporate structure of Quest during production on the game as it underwent restructuring and he had to take on the sole burden of reorganizing his team.

Matsuno created Ogre Battle as the fifth chapter in a seven-chapter "Ogre Battle Saga". His design for the world had been with him since before joining Quest, and he added to it during his work on other titles before pitching Ogre Battle. The story was written as a simplistic high fantasy battle between good and evil with a demonic enemy and little backstory, a decision Matsuno regretted due to its unrealistic tone. The central character names were recycled by Matsuno from the names he gave a party in the game Master of Monsters, which he had enjoyed playing. A challenge faced by the team was creating a 3D-like display on the limited SNES hardware. The angled perspective on battles was to contrast against the common first-person or overhead top-down views of other RPGs at the time. The graphics were handled by Hiroshi Minagawa and Akihiko Yoshida. Yoshida later described the game's character designs as "Disney-like". Ogre Battle was Yoshida's second title while working at Quest, having first done artwork for Musashi no Bōken. In addition to character art and sprite work, Yoshida also designed the cover art, a choice made to ensure high quality within budget.

Music
The music was co-composed by Masaharu Iwata, Hitoshi Sakimoto and Hayato Matsuo. It was Sakimoto's first attempt at orchestral music, as he had previously only done with in techno and electronic music. He simulated an orchestral using a Roland SC-55, using an instrument dictionary with accompanying sample CD Iwata bought to replicate the various sounds. His work on Ogre Battle informed much of his later compositional style. Matsuo described the whole experience of composing for the game as informative, as each composer informed the other's work.

A soundtrack album for the game was released in April 1993 by Datam Polystar. An arrange album was also released. A further compilation arrange album, featuring tracks from both Ogre Battle and its sequel, was released in October 1996.

Releases
Ogre Battle was released in Japan by Quest on March 12, 1993. The game's title is derived from "Ogre Battle" and "The March of the Black Queen", two songs by the British rock band Queen, of which Matsuno was a fan. The SNES version was published by the American branch of Enix in May 1995. The localization was produced by Robert Jerauld, who worked on all of Enix America's releases. Jerauld remembered Ogre Battle as one of his favorite releases. There was no official European release. In 1998, an updated edition of the Super NES version was released by Quest as a download for the Nintendo Power Cartridge in Japan. The Super NES version was re-released in North America on the Wii's Virtual Console on March 2, 2009, for 800 Nintendo points ($8). It was also released as an import in the PAL regions on July 3. The SNES version was ported to mobile devices with additional downloading maps and released in Japan by Square Enix for FOMA on September 1, 2010, and for EZweb on May 12, 2011. This version included access to wallpapers and ringtones promoting the 2010 remake of Tactics Ogre.

A PlayStation port was developed by Quest and published by Artdink on September 27, 1996. This version was localized into English under the title Ogre Battle: Limited Edition by Atlus USA in July 1997. A regional eighteen month exclusivity deal formed part of the agreement. This version features larger text boxes. It lacks the voice acting and graphical detail for the units that were included in the Saturn game. It adds the ability to save at any point (the Super NES version only allows saving at the end of each chapter). The Japan-only Sega Saturn port was developed and published by Riverhillsoft on November 1, 1996. This version, in addition to graphical upgrades, incorporates limited voice acting. The port was produced by Junji Shigematsu. A priority was ensuring the game ran with minimal lag, which was a potential issue caused by the new CD storage.

Reception

Originally planned to have a relatively small 200,000 copy print run, encouragement by Nintendo after a positive press showing had Matsuno persuading Quest to double that number. The game sold through all 400,000 copies shortly after release, turning it into a commercial success. The North American printing by Enix was limited, apparently just 25,000 units, selling out quickly and prompting several reorders. It consequently became a collector's item, with unboxed cartridges selling for over $150 each in 1997. The PlayStation version was a commercial success for Atlus in North America, prompting the localization of its sequel Tactics Ogre.

The game received generally positive reviews from critics. The four reviewers of Electronic Gaming Monthly gave the Super NES version a rave review, applauding the graphics, music, combination of genres, hidden items, and the feature which defines the player character based on answers to the questions at the beginning, remarking that this creates "a different adventure each time". GamePros Scary Larry gave it a mixed review, commenting that the game is "unique", but that the gameplay consists largely of tedious war simulation management, offering no direct control over the combat. He also criticized the overly small battle view. A reviewer for Next Generation commented that the graphics are simplistic and unimpressive but clear and easy to follow, the music is excellent, the interface is accessible, "and above all, the game play poses a serious strategic challenge".

Johnny Ballgame of GamePro gave the PlayStation version a positive review, commenting that "the gameplay and story line are identical" to the Super NES version but the audio has been remastered with "a movie-like musical score". He concluded that, with "13 endings, engrossing gameplay, and a wizard's bag full of secrets, Ogre Battle is a must-buy for RPG fans, whether or not you played the 16-bit version". Electronic Gaming Monthly commented that the PlayStation version is a "demanding strategy game loaded with secrets".

Ogre Battle was rated the 180th best game made on a Nintendo System in Nintendo Power's Top 200 Games list. In 2018, Complex named Ogre Battle number 34 on their "The Best Super Nintendo Games of All Time." IGN ranked the game 41st in its Top 100 SNES Games.

Notes

References

External links

Ogre Battle Shrine at RPGClassics
All 13 endings at VGMuseum

1993 video games
Artdink games
Atlus games
Enix games
Ogre Battle
PlayStation (console) games
Quest Corporation games
Real-time strategy video games
Real-time tactics video games
Sega Saturn games
Square Enix games
Super Nintendo Entertainment System games
Tactical role-playing video games
Video games developed in Japan
Video games featuring protagonists of selectable gender
Video games scored by Hayato Matsuo
Video games scored by Hitoshi Sakimoto
Video games scored by Masaharu Iwata
Video games with alternate endings
Video games with isometric graphics
Virtual Console games for Nintendo 3DS
Virtual Console games for Wii
Virtual Console games for Wii U
Single-player video games
Riverhillsoft games